Stanley Kenneth Schellenberger (born 7 January 1948 in Edmonton, Alberta) was a Progressive Conservative party member of the House of Commons of Canada. He was an agrologist by career.

He represented the Wetaskiwin electoral district since winning the seat in the 1972 federal election. Schellenberger won successive terms in the 1974, 1979, 1980 and 1984 federal elections. After serving in the 29th through 33rd Canadian Parliaments, Schellenberger left federal politics in 1988 and did not run for reelection.

External links
 

1948 births
Living people
Members of the House of Commons of Canada from Alberta
Politicians from Edmonton
Progressive Conservative Party of Canada MPs